The Spanish and Mexican  governments made many concessions and land grants in Alta California (now known as California) and Baja California from 1775 to 1846. The Spanish Concessions of land were made to retired soldiers as an inducement for them to remain in the frontier. These Concessions reverted to the Spanish crown upon the death of the recipient. The Mexican government later encouraged settlement by issuing much larger land grants to both native-born and naturalized Mexican citizens. Unlike Spanish Concessions, Mexican land grants provided permanent, unencumbered ownership rights. Most ranchos granted by Mexico were located along the California coast around San Francisco Bay, inland along the Sacramento River, and within the San Joaquin Valley.

When the government secularized the Mission churches in 1833, they required that land be set aside for each Neophyte family. But the Native Americans were quickly brushed aside by Californios who, with the help of those in power, acquired the church lands as grants. The indigenous peoples of the Americas ("Indians") instead became virtual slaves of the rancheros.

Spain made about 30 concessions between 1784 and 1821, and Mexico issued about 270 land grants between 1833 and 1846. The ranchos established permanent land-use patterns. The rancho boundaries became the basis for California's land survey system, and are found on modern maps and land titles. The "rancheros" (rancho owners) patterned themselves after the landed gentry of New Spain, and were primarily devoted to raising cattle and sheep. Their workers included Native Americans who had learned Spanish while living at one of the former Missions.
The ranchos were often based on access to the resources necessary for raising cattle, such as grazing lands and water. Land development from that time forward has often followed the boundaries of the ranchos, and many of their names are still in use. For example, Rancho San Diego is now an unincorporated "rural-burb" east of San Diego, and Rancho Bernardo is a suburb in San Diego.

Spanish era

 
During Spanish rule (1769–1821), the ranchos were concessions from the Spanish crown, permitting settlement and granting grazing rights on specific tracts of land, while the crown retained the title. 

Settlement on the ranchos outside presidio, mission, and pueblo boundaries began in 1784, when Juan José Domínguez received permission from Spanish Governor Pedro Fages to graze his cattle on the  Rancho San Pedro.  

The land concessions were usually measured in leagues.

Mexican era

During the Mexican era (1821–1846), grantees received legal title to the land. In 1821, Mexico achieved its independence from Spain, and California came under control of the Mexican government. The 1824 Mexican Colony Law established rules for petitioning for land grants in California; and by 1828, the rules for establishing land grants were codified in the Mexican Reglamento (Regulation). 

The Acts sought to break the land monopoly of the missions and also paved the way for luring additional settlers to California by making land grants easier to obtain. The Mexican Governors of Alta California gained the power to grant state lands, and many of the Spanish concessions were subsequently patented under Mexican law—frequently to local "friends" of the governor.

Secularization

Soldiers, rancheros,  farmers, and those in power  coveted the rich coastal lands that the missions controlled. The Mexican government was also fearful about the missions which remained loyal to the Pope and the Catholic Church in Spain. The Mexican government allowed the padres to keep only the church, priest's quarters, and priest's garden. The army troops guarding each Mission were dismissed.

A board of magistrates was to oversee the mission's crops and herds, while the land was to be divided into communal pasture, a town plot, and individual plots intended for each Indian family. In addition, one half of the herds were to be divided proportionately among the neophyte families.

But this purpose was never accomplished. In truth, only a very few Indians of Alta California were educationally or culturally equipped to accept the offering. Instead, they were further exploited by the rancheros and in many cases became virtual slaves. Most mission property was bought by government officials or their wealthy friends, local Californios, individuals of Mexican or Spanish descent who had been born in Alta California.

Ownership

The number of Mexican land grants greatly increased after secularization.  The former Mission Indians, freed from forced labor on the missions, but without land of their own, and their former way of life destroyed, often had few choices. Some lived with Indian tribes in the interior or sought work on the new ranchos along with the troops formerly assigned to each mission. They sometimes congregated at rancherías (living areas near a hacienda) where an indigenous Spanish and mestizo culture developed.

By 1846, the mission lands and its cattle had passed into the hands of 800 private landowners called rancheros. They primarily produced hides for the world leather market and largely relied on Indian labor. Bound to the rancho by peonage, the Native Americans were treated as slaves. The Native Americans who worked on the ranchos died at twice the rate that of southern slaves.

The boundaries of the Mexican ranchos were provisional. The new owner was required to complete a legal survey that established and marked the boundaries. Even if completed, the resulting  'diseño', a rough, hand-drawn relief map, often only vaguely defined the boundary lines.

The grantee could not initially subdivide or rent the land. It had to be used for grazing or cultivation. A  residence had to be built within a year—most were initially simple adobe-walled cabins. Public roads crossing through the property must remain open.

The survey and residence requirements could not be enforced. The poorly funded and relatively unorganized government had little interest in land that brought in no taxes. The government instead collected revenue from tariffs assessed on cargo arriving at Monterey, California.

American era

The Mexican–American War began on May 13, 1846 with a declaration of war by the United States of America. Action in California began with the Bear Flag Revolt on June 15, 1846, followed by the taking of Monterey on July 7, 1846, Los Angeles in August, the battle of San Pasqual on 06 Dec 1846, then retaking of Los Angeles in January 1847, which terminated the authority and jurisdiction of Mexican officials later that year. Armed resistance ended in California with the Treaty of Cahuenga signed on January 13, 1847. The Treaty of Guadalupe Hidalgo, ending the Mexican War, was signed February 2, 1848 and California became a Territory of the United States. Between 1847 and 1849, California was run by the U.S. military. A constitutional convention met in Monterey in September 1849, and set up a state government. It operated for 10 months before California was admitted to the Union as the 31st State by the United States Congress, as part of the Compromise of 1850, enacted on September 9, 1850.

Gold Rush
While the end of the 1840s saw the close of Mexican control over Alta California, this period also marked the beginning of the rancheros’ greatest prosperity. Cattle had been raised primarily for their hides and tallow, as there was no market for large quantities of beef, especially in the days prior to refrigeration, railroads or ice production. Demand dramatically changed with the onset of the Gold Rush, as thousands of miners and other fortune seekers flooded into northern California. These newcomers needed meat, and cattle prices soared with demand. The rancheros enjoyed the halcyon days of Hispanic California.

Land claims

The Treaty of Guadalupe Hidalgo provided that the Mexican land grants would be honored. To investigate and confirm titles in California, American officials acquired the provincial records of the Spanish and Mexican governments in Monterey.

The new state's leaders soon discovered that the Mexican government had given a number of grants just before the Americans gained control. The Mexican governors had rewarded faithful supporters, and hoped to prevent the new immigrants from gaining control of the land. Sponsored by California Senator William M. Gwin, in 1851 Congress passed "An Act to Ascertain and Settle Private Land Claims in the State of California". The Act required all holders of Spanish and Mexican land grants to present their titles for confirmation before the Board of California Land Commissioners. Contrary to the Treaty of Guadalupe Hidalgo, this Act placed the burden of proof of title on landholders. Grantees were required to prove the validity of the grants they had received and establish their exact boundaries. The diseños (maps) available were often hand-drawn and imprecise. Land had until the gold rush been of little value and boundary locations were often quite vague, referring to an oak tree, a cow skull on a pile of rocks, a creek, and in some cases a mountain range.

The settlement of land titles was frequently complicated and lengthy. Even in cases where the boundaries were more specific, many markers had been destroyed before accurate surveys could be made. Aside from indefinite survey lines, the Land Commission had to determine whether the grantees had fulfilled the requirements of the Mexican colonization laws. Mexican officials often did not keep adequate records and sometimes did not provide grantees with any documentation of the grant. Many grants required additional approvals before they were legal. Conditions of the grant required the grantee to live on the land. All of these requirements were rarely fulfilled.

While the Land Commission confirmed 604 of the 813 claims it reviewed, most decisions were appealed to US District Court and some to the Supreme Court. The confirmation process required lawyers, translators, and surveyors, and took an average of 17 years (including the Civil War, 1861–1865) to resolve. It proved expensive for landholders to defend their titles through the court system. In many cases, they had to sell or give title to a portion of their land to pay for defense fees or gave attorneys land in lieu of payment.

Rejected Spanish and Mexican land claims resulted in conflicting claims by the grantees, squatters, and settlers seeking the same land. This resulted in pressure on Congress to change the rules. This resulted in additional pressure on Congress, and beginning with Rancho Suscol in 1863, it passed special acts that allowed certain claimants to pre-empt their land without regard to acreage. By 1866 this privilege was extended to all owners of rejected claims.

A number of ranchos remained in whole or in part in the sliver of territory of Alta California left to Mexico by the Treaty of Guadalupe Hidalgo, which then became part of Baja California. Rancho Tía Juana (partially in San Diego County, California) lost its claim to title to its land in San Diego County but the balance of the rancho was confirmed by the Mexican government in the 1880s. Rancho El Rosario, Rancho Cueros de Venado and Rancho Tecate were each granted to citizens of San Diego in the 1820s or 1830s and lay wholly in what is now Baja California as was the Rancho San Antonio Abad, whose origin and title is more obscure. Their titles were never subjected to dispute in U.S. courts.

Disintegration

The rancheros became land-rich and cash-poor, and the burden of attempting to defend their claims was often financially overwhelming. Grantees lost their lands as a result of mortgage default, payment of attorney fees, or payment of other personal debts. Land was also lost as a result of fraud. A sharp decline in cattle prices, the floods of 1861–1862, and droughts of 1863–1864 also forced many of the overextended rancheros to sell their properties to Americans. They often quickly subdivided the land and sold it to new settlers, who began farming individual plots.

A shift in the economic dominance of grain farming over cattle raising was marked by the passage of the California "No-Fence Law" of 1874. This repealed the Trespass Act of 1850, which had required farmers to protect their planted fields from free-ranging cattle. The repeal of the Trespass Act required that ranchers fence stock in, rather than farmers fencing cattle out. The ranchers were faced with either the high expense of fencing large grazing tracts or selling their cattle at ruinous prices.

Legacy

The ranchos established land-use patterns that are still recognizable in contemporary California. Many communities still retain their Spanish rancho name. For example, Rancho Peñasquitos, the first land grant by the Spanish in today's San Diego County, is now a suburb within the city of San Diego. Modern communities often follow the original boundaries of the rancho, based on geographic features and abstract straight lines. Today, most of the original rancho land grants have been dismantled and sold off to become suburbs and rural-burbs. A very small number of ranchos are still owned by descendants of the original owners, retain their original size, or remain undeveloped.

Rancho Guejito in San Diego County is considered the last of the San Diego Ranchos to be undeveloped. Benjamin Coates purchased the land in the 1970s after Governor Jerry Brown vetoed a purchase that would have made Guejito a state park. Coates purchased an additional  of surrounding land between the 1970s and his death in 2004. Coates and his wife Nancy both expressed their wishes that the Rancho remain undeveloped. After her death in 2006, ownership of the land passed to their daughter, Theodate Coates, an artist from New York City. Despite her parents' wishes that development be kept off of the Rancho, she has taken steps to remove Rancho Guejito's status as an agricultural preserve and eventually develop the land into tract housing.

Notes and references

Further reading
Avina, Rose H. (1976). Spanish and Mexican Land Grants in California, Arno Press, New York.
Baker, Charles C. (1914). Mexican Land Grants in California,  Historical Society of Southern California, Vol IX, pp. 236–243

Becker, Robert H. (1969). Designs on the land : disenos of California ranchos and their makers. San Francisco, Book Club of California.

See also
List of ranchos of California
Spanish missions in California
List of Spanish missions in California

External links

Alameda County Mexican Land Grants
Contra Costa County Mexican Land Grants
Land Grants in Alta California
Los Angeles County Spanish and Mexican ranchos
Marin County Mexican Land Grants
 Marin County's Original Ranchos
Monterey County Mexican Land Grants 
Napa County Mexican Land Grants
Orange County Spanish and Mexican Ranchos
San Benito County Mexican Land Grants
San Francisco County Mexican Land Grants
San Mateo County Mexican Land Grants 
Santa Barbara County Rancho Map
Santa Clara County Mexican Land Grants
Santa Clara Ranchos, Grants, Patents and Maps
Santa Cruz CountyMexican Land Grants
Sonoma County Mexican Land Grants
Sonoma County Mexican Land Grants
Tehama County Mexican Land Grants
Ventura County Spanish and Mexican Land Grants

 
Baja California Ranchos

The Californias
Mexican California
Geographic history of California
Pre-statehood history of California
Cultural landscapes
Land law
Veterans' settlement schemes